Phyllis Fong is an American attorney serving as the inspector general of the United States Department of Agriculture. Fong was nominated to the position in 2002 by President George W. Bush.

Early life and education 
Fong was born in Philadelphia and raised in Honolulu. She earned a Bachelor of Arts degree in Asian studies from Pomona College and Juris Doctor from the Vanderbilt University Law School.

Career 
Fong began her career as a staff attorney for the United States Commission on Civil Rights. She then served as assistant general counsel for the Legal Services Corporation and assistant inspector general for management and policy. After serving as assistant inspector general for management and legal counsel, Fong was nominated to serve as inspector general of the Small Business Administration in 1999. Fong was nominated to serve as inspector general of the United States Department of Agriculture in 2002 and was confirmed on December 2, 2002.

In April 2020, Fong was appointed to serve as a member of the Pandemic Response Accountability Committee.

Personal life 
Fong and her husband, Paul Tellier, have two children. Tellier is also an attorney.

References 

American women lawyers
American lawyers
Living people
People from Honolulu
People from Philadelphia
Pomona College alumni
United States Department of Agriculture officials
United States Department of Agriculture people
United States Inspectors General by name
Vanderbilt University Law School alumni
Year of birth missing (living people)